Use Your Confusion is a 2006 studio album by American hip hop group Juggaknots. It was released on Amalgam Digital.

Critical reception

Marisa Brown of AllMusic wrote, "It certainly shows the Juggaknots' maturity and their abilities as complete artists, and is a welcome return." Nate Patrin of Pitchfork called the album "one of the most immediate and accessible indie rap records of 2006" and "a strong reestablishment of a group too good to be forgotten." A. L. Friedman of PopMatters commented that "the lyrics are worth dissecting and the Juggaknots sound as good as ever."

Track listing

References

External links
 

2006 albums
Juggaknots albums
Amalgam Digital albums
Albums produced by Oh No (musician)
Albums produced by J-Zone